The 2005 Australian Formula Ford Championship was a CAMS sanctioned national motor racing title for drivers of Formula Ford racing cars.

Calendar
The title was contested over an eight-round series with three races per round.
 Round 1, Adelaide Parkland Circuit, South Australia, 18-19-20 March 
 Round 2, Barbagallo Raceway, Wanneroo, Western Australia, 7–8 May
 Round 3, Eastern Creek International Raceway, New South Wales, 27-28-29 May
 Round 4, Eastern Creek International Raceway, New South Wales, 9–10 June
 Round 5, Queensland Raceway, Ipswich, Queensland, 23–24 July
 Round 6, Oran Park Motorsport Circuit, New South Wales, 13–14 August
 Round 7, Mallala Motor Sport Park, South Australia, 20–21 August
 Round 8, Sandown International Motor Raceway, Victoria, 10–11 September

Points
Championship points were awarded on a 20-16-14-12-10-8-6-4-2-1 basis to the top ten finishers in each race with an additional point awarded to the driver earning pole position for Race 1 at each round.

Results

 Shane Price was penalised 10 championship points as a result of an incident in Round 3. 
 Nathan Caratti was penalised 2 championship points as a result of an incident in Round 4. 
 Anthony Preston was penalised 2 championship points as a result of an incident in Round 4. 
 The table shows nett points after these penalties were applied.

References

External links
 CAMS Bulletin B05/024, retrieved 23/05/08

Further reading
 Grant Rowley, The Annual - Australian Motor Sport, Number 1/2005, pages 66–75

Australian Formula Ford Championship seasons
Formula Ford